The A2100 is a model of communications satellite spacecraft made by Lockheed Martin Space Systems. It is used as the foundation for telecommunications payloads in geosynchronous orbit, as well as GOES-R weather satellites and GPS Block IIIA satellites. Over 40 satellites use the A2100 bus.

History
The first satellite, AMC-1, was launched September 8, 1996, and has achieved 15-year on-orbit service life.  Since 1996 there have been over 45 of the A2100 based satellites launched, with over 400 years of total on-orbit service.
Other A2100 spacecraft include JCSAT-13 and VINASAT-2, which were launched May, 2012 on an Ariane 5 rocket, as well as Arabsat-6A and Hellas Sat 4/SaudiGeoSat-1 of Saudi Arabia's Arabsat-6G program.

In 2002, Lockheed Martin Commercial Space Systems was given a Frost and Sullivan Satellite Reliability Award for excellence in the production of flexible and reliable communications satellites used in geosynchronous Earth orbit.

A2100 customers includes communications companies around the world, including Astra, Telesat, SKY Perfect JSAT Group and others.

Design
The Lockheed Martin A2100 geosynchronous spacecraft series is designed for a variety of telecommunications needs including Ka band broadband and broadcast services, fixed satellite services in C-band and Ku band payload configurations, high-power direct broadcast services using the Ku band frequency spectrum, and mobile satellite services using UHF, L-band and S-band payloads. 

The A2100 satellite system was developed by the Astro Space team at its East Windsor, New Jersey facility, with team members delivering a flexible common bus with fewer components, lower spacecraft weight, and reduced customer delivery time.

The A2100 is being supplanted by the LM2100, an evolutionary upgrade with several new features. The military version is the LM2100 Combat Bus.

Propulsion system
The attitude control system includes reaction wheels, with momentum desaturation and main motor maneuver attitude control propulsion provided by small monopropellant hydrazine motors. This hydrazine supply is contained in a central propellant tank of 0.90 m diameter and up to 2.00 m length depending on the customer's requirements.
This tank's maximum length was later increased to 2.55 m.
The liquid apogee engine uses hydrazine fuel from the central tank along with nitrogen tetroxide oxidizer from two flanking tanks of 0.54 m diameter and up to 1.65 m long.
Orbit maintenance is performed by the small hydrazine motors and ion thrusters.
The maximum propellant supply (with the largest tanks at 95% fill factor) are 1368 kg of hydrazine fuel and 627 kg of nitrogen tetroxide oxidizer.

According to Moog-ISP, the A2100 platform uses its LEROS bipropellant Liquid Apogee Engine.

Satellite orders

A2100A

A2100AX

A2100AXS

A2100M (Military)

LM2100 (Modernized)

LM2100M (Modernized Military)

Cancelled orders

References

Satellite buses
Lockheed Martin